Muhammed Haneefa (22 April 1951 – 2 February 2010), better known by his stage name Cochin Haneefa, was an Indian actor, film director, and screenwriter. He started his career in the 1970s mainly portraying villainous roles, before going on to become one of the most popular comedians of Malayalam cinema. He acted in more than 300 films in Malayalam and Tamil.

As a director he is best known for the films Aankiliyude Tharattu (1987) and Vatsalyam (1993).

Personal life and education
Haneefa was born in Cochin (present-day Kochi) to Kochi Velthedathu Tharavattil A.B. Muhammed and Hajira, as the second among their eight children. He studied at Kochi St. Augustine's School and St. Albert's College and graduated with a degree in commerce.

Career
He made his film debut in 1972 in Azhimukham directed by Vijayan and went on to act in over 300 films in Malayalam. He also acted in over 80 Tamil films, including popular movies like Mahanadi with Kamal Haasan, Sivaji and Enthiran with Rajinikanth.

Haneefa played memorable roles in many Malayalam films, including Mannar Mathai Speaking, Devaasuram, Kireedam, Chenkol , Punjabi House and Swapnakoodu, Pulivaal Kalyanam, Meesa Madhavan, C.I.D Moosa, Thilakkam etc. He also directed around 20 films, including Valtsalyam and Moonu Masangalkku Munbu. The last Tamil films in which he appeared were Madrasapattinam and Enthiran. His final Malayalam film was the 2010 film Bodyguard.

Even though he started off in villain roles, he slowly transitioned to the comedic characters. He had also played dramatic supporting character roles to a great effect. Haneefa's comedic roles smartly captured his physique in a self-deprecating nature and eventually, he became one of the most popular comedians in Malayalam cinema. In Kireedam, he played the role of Hydrose, a hilarious rowdy. His first noted role as a comedian came in Mannar Mathai Speaking, where he played the role of Eldho. Punjabi House was the movie which established him as a major comedian in Malayalam cinema. Considered one of the best slapstick comedy film in Malayalam cinema, Haneefa portrayed the character Gangadharan in the movie. Punjabi House was a major breakthrough in the careers of Harishree Asokan and Dileep as well. The movie eventually developed into a cult. Haneefa along with these Asokan and Dileep eventually formed a successful trio in Malayalam cinema. They acted together in numerous movies such as Udayapuram Sulthan, Ee Parakkum Thalika, Meesa Madhavan, Thilakkam, C.I.D. Moosa, Runway and Pandippada. Haneefa played the role of S.I Veerappan Kurupp in the 2001 slapstick comedy movie Ee Parakkum Thalika. He again played the role of a hilarious police officer, this time becoming Sudarshanan in the movie Snehithan, which was released the same year. His role as Mathukkutty in the 2002 film Mazhathullikkilukkam was also noted. Haneefa's character Thrivikraman in the 2002 movie Meesa Madhavan was highly appreciated. It was the highest-grossing movie of that year and many of the characters in the movie like Pillechan and Pattalam Purushu became a cult. It was in the year 2003 that Haneefa played some of the best iconic comedy characters in his career. In Thilakkam, he became the local rowdy called Bhaskaran and in Kilichundan Mampazham, he portrayed the role of Kalanthan Haji. Haneefa's one of the career best role came in the slapstick comedy movie C.I.D Moosa, where he played the role of Vikaraman. Similar to that of Punjabi House, Ee Parakkum Thalika and Meesa Madhavan, the performance of Dileep-Asokan-Haneefa trio along with Jagathy Sreekumar in this movie were highly appreciated and it became the second highest-grossing movie in 2003. In Swapnakoodu, he played the role of Philipose and as Panchayath President in Vellithira. Haneefa's another memorable character came out in the movie Pulival Kalyanam, where he played as Dharmendra, often mistaken in the movie with the Bollywood legendary superstar of the same name. This movie was well appreciated especially for the comedy scenes between Haneefa and Salim Kumar, who played as Manavalan in the movie. Manavalan eventually became a cult character in Malayalam cinema.

Awards
Kerala State Film Awards:
 2001 – Second Best Actor – Soothradharan

Death
Haneefa died on February 2, 2010, aged 58, at Sri Ramachandra Hospital in Chennai, from multiple organ failure. He had been treated for liver cancer. He was buried at Ernakulam Central Juma Masjid with full state honours.

Filmography

As actor

Malayalam films

1970s

1980s

1990s

2000s

2010s

Tamil films

Hindi films

Telugu films

As director

Malayalam Films

 Bheesmacharya (1994)
 Vatsalyam (1993)
 Veena Meettiya Vilangukal (1990)
 Aankiliyude Tharattu (1987)
 Oru Sindoora Pottinte Ormaykku (1987)
 Moonnu Masangalkku Munpu (1986)
 Oru Sandesam Koodi (1985)

Tamil films
 Paasa Paravaigal (1988)
 Paadatha Thenikkal (1988)
 Pagalil Pournami (1990)
 Pillai Paasam (1991)
 Vaasalile Oru Vennila (1991)
 Naalai Engal Kalyanam (later released as Kadalora Kaadhal)

As writer
 Aval Oru Devaalayam (1977) (Directed by A.B. Raj)
 Adima Changala (1981) (Directed by A.B. Raj)
 Ithihasam (1981)
 Chicagoyil Cheenthiya Raktham
 Aarambham (1982) (Directed by Joshi)
 Dheera (1982) (Directed by Joshi)
 Thaalam Thettiya Tharattu (1983) (Directed by A.B. Raj)
 Sandharbham (1984) (Directed by Joshi)
 Inakkilly (1984) (Directed by Joshi)
 Piriyilla Naam (1984) (Directed by Joshi)
 Parayanumvayya Parayathirikkanumvayya (1985) (Directed by Priyadarshan)
 Puthiya Karukkal (1989) (Directed by Thampi Kannanthanam)
 Lal Americayil (1989) (Directed by Sathyan Anthikkad)
 Kadathanadan Ambadi (1990) (Directed by Priyadarshan)
 Bheesmacharya (1994) (Directed by himself)
 Mission (2010)

See also
 Tamil cinema
 Malayalam Cinema

References

External links
 
 Cochin Haneefa at MSI
 "Cochin Haneefa Passed Away"
 Notice of death of Cochin Haneefa aka Salim Ahmed Ghoush
 Mathrubhumi Online website

1951 births
2010 deaths
Deaths from liver cancer
Indian male film actors
Indian male comedians
Kerala State Film Award winners
Male actors from Kochi
Male actors in Tamil cinema
Malayalam screenwriters
Malayalam film directors
Deaths from multiple organ failure
Male actors in Malayalam cinema
Film directors from Kochi
Tamil film directors
20th-century Indian film directors
20th-century Indian dramatists and playwrights
Tamil screenwriters
20th-century Indian male actors
21st-century Indian male actors
Screenwriters from Kochi
Deaths from cancer in India